Phan Thai Norasing is a legendary figure mentioned in some later editions of the royal chronicles of Ayutthaya. He is described as a coxswain of King Sanphet VIII's royal barge in the Ayutthaya period who was famous for honesty and integrity. Phan Thai Norasing served his duty as the coxswain until around 1704 that the accident was happened during King Sanphet VIII's fishing trip causing damage to the boat. From this, he willingly accepted the consequence according to Thai ancient monarch law which is execution. Although, he was given a pardon not to be headed. From his heroic decision, he became the historical figure and is worshipped by a later generation. Therefore, there are many legacies dedicated to him such as his shrines which they are presumed to be his execution spots, renovated canal, and a monument, etc. Also, a story of Phan Thai Norasing has been conveyed through various forms of entertainment including films, TV series, and musicals. Even though plots of them might be altered or extended but the core of the story regarding honesty will still be presented to be an example for progeny.

Life 
Even though it cannot be fully confirmed whether he actually existed or not. But based on few available historic records, the original name of Phan Thai Norasing is "Sing" (Thai:สิงห์) and his birthplace is assumed to be Bhan Bha Mhok, Ang Thong in current time. Also, he had a wife named "Sri Naun". For "Phan Thai", it is a title for coxswain in Thai and how Sing earned this title started from the first meeting between Sing and King Sanphet VIII (Phrachao Suea) during King Sanphet VIII's trip in Ang Thong. During the trip, he disguised as a civilian and met Sing through boxing match. After that, Sing was called by King Sanphet VIII and became coxswain or "Phan Thai" in Thai and became very close after that.

Death 

According to historical records, the execution of Phan Thai Norasing occurred 1704 at Khok Kham Canal, Sakornburi (Samut Sakorn in the present time). The name of Phrachao Suea's royal barge that Phan Tha Norasing steering is Ekkachai. Khok Kham canal before restoration was very twisted so, it was very hazardous to travel through. However, Phan Thai Norasing chose this path accidentally or some historians suggest that he wanted to protect King Sanphet VIII from assassins. Eventually, the royal barge was accidentally hit with a large tree and the figurehead of the royal barge was damaged and fallen off. The consequence of guilty coxswain is beheading based on ancient monarch law. Sing was initially given a special pardon from King Sanphet VIII because he thought it was just an accident but Sing denied. King Sanphet then ordered the crew to create a clay statue represented Sing and beheaded it instead. However, Sing still insisted so King Sanphet VIII had no choice but ordering him to be executed.

Legacy 
Because of his life story, he is worshipped and respected by later generation as well as becoming a model of honesty. From this, many shrines and statues were built to dedicate his heroic action. Locations of shrines are based on presumed execution points which are around Khok kham canal.

Phan Thai Norasing's shrine 
This shrine is located at the mouth of Khok Kham canal, Phanthai Norasing, Muang Samut Sakorn, Samut Sakorn. It is believed to be the oldest original point of Phan Thai Norasing's execution. For the shrine, it was an eyes-level height shrine that contained the head of Phan Thai Norasing and the figurehead of the Ekkachai barge together. As time goes by, the original shrine was scoured and destroyed by water. In 1950, however, the new shrine was constructed by His Royal Highness Prince Panuphun Yukhon from filming a movie in the same year. The new shrine is also eyes-level height and has 6 legs. Additionally, there is a statue of Phan Thai Norasing which is made up of sandalwood.

Phan Thai Norasing Historical Park 
the location of this historic park is Bhan Phanthai, Phanthai Norasing, Muang Samut Sakorn, Samut Sakorn. It is also believed to be an original point of Phan Thai Norasing's execution as the damaged 80-centimetres wood believed to be the figurehead and a stick were found by the Fine Arts Department and  teachers of Suankularb Wittayalai School. Through scientific examination, these woods were in the same period as Phan Thai Norasing. So, the stick was hypothesized to be scaffold of Phan Thai Norasing's execution. This place was registered as a national historic site by the Fine Arts Department published in Government Gazette Volume 53, page 1533 on 27 September 1936. and the new shrine was reconstructed  by Fine Art Department at 4 January 1995. In the shrine, the real-size statue is created and established in 1976. The pose of a real-size statue of Phan Thai Norasing is steering a barge. Moreover, people usually come to the shrine to worship his shrine for fortune and wishes, According to historic records, Sing loves Thai boxing and cock fighting thus, people commonly worship Phan Thai Norasing's shine with cock statuettes, boxing glove and paddle. There is also a 300-years old barge presumed to be a ruin of a royal processor or an army dispatch. The dimensions of this barge are 19.47 meters by length, 2.09 meters by width, 1 meters by height, and 7.5-centimeters thick gunnels

Mahachai canal 
Created after the execution of Phan Thai Norasing, to mourn his integrity and improve the convenience of water transportation. The excavation was occurred and was started from the reign of King Sanphet VIII to the reign of  King Sanphet IX ( King Sanphet VIII's son). The starting point of this canal is en entrance of Tha Chin River to Khok Kham as the end. This canal has 3 meters deep, 16 meters wide, and 10 meters deep (bottom). There are 30,000 workers who worked on this canal. The former/alternative name was Khok Kham canal. It was also called "Dhan canal" by people on Thonburi side.

Phan Thai Norasing 's Monument 
It is located at Norasing, Bha Mhok, Ang Thong which was believed to be his birthplace so, this monument was constructed to honor him. The opening ceremony of the monument was on 4 November 1989.

Norasing Sub-district 
According to the historic record, Phan Thai Norasing was presumed to be civilian in this place which was located at Bhan Bha Mhok district, Ang Thong so, this sub-district was later established to dedicate to Phan Thai Norasing's loyalty and devotion.

In popular culture 
Many media of entertainment have been telling the heroic story of Phan Thai Norasing including musicals, movies, and TV series. Also, comics and books are prominent media too.

Musicals

Phan Thai Norasing (1945) 
This is the very first time that the story of Phan Thai Norasing was made into a form of entertainment. The plot of this musical was adapted from royal chronicle and historical facts in the reign of King Sanphet VIII by His Royal Highness Prince Panuphun Yukhon. It was performed by Siwarhom crew which main characters are Surasit Sattayawong as Phan Thai Norasing, Suphan Buranaphim as Naun, and Jhok Dokjan as King Sanphet VIII. In this musical, there is a soundtrack titled "naam dtaa saeng-dtai" (น้ำตาแสงใต้ in Thai), in the farewell scene between Sing and Naun.the track and musical was very beloved during and after World War II.

Phan Thai Norasing (1965) 
This musical was a special stage for charity hosted by Thai association against Drug Abuse and Illicit Trafficking. The musical was performed at Thammasat University's auditorium. Main characters are played by Gamton Suwanbpiyasìrí as Phan Thai Norasing, Nonglak Rohjonpan as Naun, and Chalong Simasatian as King Sanphet VIII.

Phan Thai Norasing (1989) 
The musical was performed at Chalerm tai theaters. It is a special  event as a farewell before it was demolished. Main characters are played by Saranyoo Wonggrajaang as Phan Thai Norasing, Nataya Daengbungaa as Naun, and Pisaan Akarasaynee as King Sanphet VIII.

Movies

Phan Thai Norasing (1950) 
This was firstly recreated as a movie by His Royal Highness Prince Panuphun Yukhon.The plot is adapted from the plot of the first musical. Main characters were played by Choochai Prakanchai, a famous Thai boxer as Phan Thai Norasing, Suphan Buranaphim as Naun, and Tanom Akarasaynee as King Sanphet VIII. The director of this movie by Marut. Release date of this movie was 1 March 1950

Phrachao Suea Phan Thai Norasing (1982) 
This movie was produced in 35 mm movie film by Chaiyo Productions Co., Ltd.. The movie's name is "Phrachao Suea Phan Thai Norasing". Main characters were played by Sorapong Chatree as Phan Thai Norasing, Apaporn Konthip as Naun, and Sombat Metanee as King Sanphet VIII. This movie was also directed by Marut

Phan Thai Norasing (2015) 
This version was directed by Prince Chatrichalerm Yukol. The plot is also based on the plot of His Royal Highness Prince Panuphun Yukhon. The release date is 30 December 2015. Main characters were played by Pongsakorn Maytdtagaanon as Phan Thai Norasing, Lieutenant Colonel Wanchana Sawasdee as King Sanphet VIII, and Pimdao Panitsamai as Naun

Television Series

Phan Thai Norasing (1972) 
The first TV series version was aired on channel 4 Bangkhunprom which is now MCOT HD channel. Main characters were played by Gamton Suwanbpiyasìrí as Phan Thai Norasing and Nonglak Rohjonpan as Naun.

Phan Thai Norasing (1978) 
This version was aired on channel 5. Main characters were played by Nirut Sirijanya as Phan Thai Norasing and Duangjai Hataigan as Naun

Phan Thai Norasing (2000) 
This version was firstly aired on channel 7. There are 28 episodes in total. The plot was adapted from a movie version written by His Royal Highness Prince Panuphun Yukhon. This version was directed by Pisaan Akarasaynee. Main characters were played by Teerapat Sajakul as Phan Thai Norasing, Phiyada Jutharattanakul as Naun, and Pongpat Wachirabunjong as King Sanphet VIII.

Phan Thai Norasing (2016) 
This latest version was directed and written by Chatrichalerm Yukol. Main characters were played by Pongsakorn Maytdtagaanon as Phan Thai Norasing, Lieutenant Colonel Wanchana Sawasdee as King Sanphet VIII, and Pimdao Panitsamai as Naun. The series was started on air on 4 March 2016 and ended on 6 June 2016, 19 episodes in total. It was aired on Workpoint channel.

References 

Legendary Thai people
People from the Ayutthaya Kingdom
Executed Thai people
People executed by Thailand by decapitation